Craig McPherson is a Republican member of the Kansas House of Representatives, representing the 8th district (Overland Park in Johnson County) since 2013, defeating Sheryl Spalding after redistricting.

References

External links
Page on Kansas Legislature
Campaign website
Official homepage
Openstates
Follow the Money
Capwiz Biography

Republican Party members of the Kansas House of Representatives
Living people
21st-century American politicians
1984 births